This is a list of the rulers of the ancient Maya city-state Copán (current western Honduras). The list only includes Rulers after 426 when K'inich Yax K'uk' Mo' reformed Copán.

Copán was ruled by the Yax Kuk Mo dynasty, installed in 426, by Teotihuacan influence and support of the ruler Sihyaj Chan K'awiil II of Tikal, ruled between the 5th and 9th century. The architectural works (buildings, pyramids, statues, temples, altars and sports centers) built in Copán during the government of the Yax K'uk Mo' dynasty are preserved today, being accessible to the general public. Yax Kuk Mo means First Quetzal Macaw.

Copán was completely abandoned around the year 827 AD.

Notes

References

 

Copán